Melanocharacidium is a fish genus in the family Crenuchidae (South American darters). They are found in the Amazon, Orinoco and Araguaia basins, as well as river basins of the Guianas.

Species
There are currently nine recognized species in this genus:

 Melanocharacidium auroradiatum W. J. E. M. Costa & Vicente, 1994
 Melanocharacidium blennioides (C. H. Eigenmann, 1909)
 Melanocharacidium compressus Buckup, 1993
 Melanocharacidium depressum Buckup, 1993
 Melanocharacidium dispilomma Buckup, 1993
 Melanocharacidium melanopteron Buckup, 1993
 Melanocharacidium nigrum Buckup, 1993
 Melanocharacidium pectorale Buckup, 1993
 Melanocharacidium rex (J. E. Böhlke, 1958)

References

Characiformes genera
Fish of South America
Crenuchidae